Tamás Tóth (born 1989) is a Hungarian professional triathlete.

Tamás Tóth may also refer to:

Tamás Tóth (sport shooter), born 1965
Tamás Tóth (swimmer), born 1992

See also
Thomas Toth, Canadian long-distance runner